Cancellara is a town and comune in the province of Potenza, in the Southern Italian region of Basilicata. It is bounded by the comuni of Acerenza, Avigliano, Oppido Lucano, Pietragalla, Tolve, Vaglio Basilicata.

References 

Cities and towns in Basilicata